Laura Maureen Bertram (born 5 September 1978) is a Canadian actress best known for her roles as Amanda Zimm in Ready or Not and Trance Gemini in Andromeda.

Life and career
Bertram was born in Toronto, Ontario, and lives in Vancouver, British Columbia. She earned her degree in history from the University of Guelph. She has two younger sisters named Heather (born 1981) and Jennifer (born 1984), who are former actresses. In 1997, Bertram was a ceramics instructor at Kilcoo Camp. She also used to sing in the Canadian Children's Opera Chorus.

Her credits include the TV series Ready or Not, Are You Afraid of the Dark?, Seasons of Love, Andromeda as Trance Gemini, Supernatural, and the movies Night of the Twisters, and Dear America: So Far From Home. She appeared in Season 2 of Robson Arms.

Bertram was a high school teacher; in addition, she also taught young actors at Biz Studio in Vancouver.

Bertram is married with a husband and two children.

Awards
Bertram has won two Gemini Awards for "Best Performance in a Children's or Youth Program or Series" for Ready or Not in 1995 and for "Best Performance in a Children's or Youth Program or Series" for Ready or Not in 1998.

She has also been nominated for two Gemini Awards for "Best Performance in a Children's or Youth Program or Series" for Ready or Not in 1996 and for Best Performance by an Actress in a Leading Role in a Dramatic Program or Mini-Series for Platinum in 1998.

Filmography

Film

Television

Awards and nominations

References

External links
 

1978 births
Living people
Actresses from Toronto
Actresses from Vancouver
Canadian child actresses
Canadian film actresses
Canadian schoolteachers
Canadian television actresses
University of Guelph alumni
20th-century Canadian actresses
21st-century Canadian actresses